Alceu Ribeiro (13 December 1919, in Artigas Department – 22 November 2013, in Palma, Majorca) was a Uruguayan painter and sculptor.

References

External links

 Currículum de Alceu Ribeiro en Sala Dalmau. 
 Selección de artículos de prensa sobre Alceu Ribeiro en Sala Dalmau. 
 Selección de obras de Alceu Ribeiro. 

1919 births
2013 deaths
Uruguayan people of Portuguese descent
People from Artigas Department
Uruguayan sculptors
Male sculptors
Uruguayan painters
Uruguayan male artists
Male painters